TCDD E52500 is a series of electric locomotives used by the Turkish State Railways, comprising 22 class 441-9 locomotives leased from Željeznice Federacije Bosne i Hercegovine in Bosnia-Herzegovina. They are used throughout the electrified parts of the Turkish rail network. The locomotives have a power output of 3,860 kW and are capable of 120, 140 or 160 km/h speed depending on the version.

The locomotives were originally built from 1967 onwards for Yugoslav Railways by ASEA of Sweden and Končar in Croatia, then part of Yugoslavia. They were based on ASEA's Rb design for Swedish Railways. 

The first fifteen locomotives were delivered to TCDD in 1998, followed by five more in 1999 and two in 2004 and 2005 respectively. They have been modernised by having the diodes replaced with thyristor rectifiers, making them similar to the Rc, the thyristor-based successor to the Rb.

Two units were scrapped after the Tavşancıl accident in 2004. The two replacement units delivered in 2004-05 have higher top speeds that the other units, who could only run at 140 km/h.

These locomotives were withdrawn from TCDD on April 3, 2011 upon finish of the lease contract. The last 8 sets were taken out from the fleet in 2014.

References

External links

 Trains of Turkey on E52500

ASEA locomotives
Bo-Bo locomotives
Electric locomotives of Turkey
25 kV AC locomotives
Railway locomotives introduced in 1967
Standard gauge locomotives of Turkey